S. P. Adithanar Literary award, is presented annually to recognize Tamil author for their literature work.  It was instituted by Daily Thanthi groups in the memory of S. P. Adithanar, founder of Daily Thanthi. The award is presented on anniversary celebration of S.P. Adithanar every year at Rani Seethai Hall.  It consists of 2 Lakh rupees prize money.

Recipients 
 V Irai Anbu 2017
 Thayammal aravanan 2016
 Thangar Bachan 2015
 G. Balan 2014
 Mylswamy Annadurai 2013 Kaiyaruke Nila
 Vikraman 2012 - Marupakkam
 Gouthama Neelambaran 2011
 Ponnadiyan  for Ponnadiyan Kavithaigal 
 Dr.Valampuri John for his Book 'Nayagam enkal thayagam'a book on Nabikal Nayakam.
 Kavikko S. Abdul Rahman (2007)

Also See
 S. P. Adithanar Senior Tamil Scholar Award

References 

Tamil-language literature
Indian literary awards